John Penrose Angold (c. 1909 – 31 December 1943) was a British poet and translator who died while serving with the RAF during World War II. A Collected Poems appeared in 1952. His death is lamented in Ezra Pound's Pisan Cantos.

References

1900s births
1943 deaths
20th-century British poets
Royal Air Force personnel killed in World War II
Royal Air Force officers